The Wild Animals in Circuses Act 2019 is an act of the Parliament of the United Kingdom which prohibited the use of wild animals in travelling circuses.

Provisions
The provisions of the act include:
Prohibiting the use of wild animals in travelling circuses in England. Breaching this law was made an offence punishable with a fine.
Making provision for inspections of circuses to ensure compliance.
Amending Section 5(2) of the Dangerous Wild Animals Act 1976 to make it apply only to Wales.

Definitions
"Wild animals" are defined as those not commonly domesticated in Great Britain.
Animals are "used" if they perform or are exhibited as part of the circus.

See also
Animal acts in circuses

References

United Kingdom Acts of Parliament 2019
Animal welfare and rights legislation in the United Kingdom
Circuses
2019 in British law